The New Deal was Franklin D. Roosevelt's legislative agenda for rescuing the United States from the Great Depression.

New Deal may also refer to:

 New Deal (United Kingdom), a program of United Kingdom government policies focused on unemployment 
 New Deal (British political party), a political party in the United Kingdom
 New Deal (French political party), a political party in France
 New Deal (railway), an Australian passenger rail reform program
 New Deal, Tennessee, a census designated place
 New Deal, Texas, a small town near Lubbock
 New Deal coalition, a collection of political interest groups
 New Deal for Communities, a United Kingdom government program focused on urban renewal
 New Deal for Young People, a United Kingdom government Welfare-to-Work program for 18- to 24-year-olds introduced in April 1998
 The New Deal, a promotion in United Kingdom pub chain Wetherspoons premiered in January 2009
 The New Deal (band)
 The New Deal (album)
 NewDeal, a software company
 "The New Deal" (Agents of S.H.I.E.L.D.), an episode of Agents of S.H.I.E.L.D.
 "The New Deal" (Ready or Not), an episode of Ready or Not
 The Green New Deal, a proposed United States legislative package to address climate-change and environmental sustainability
 A Green New Deal, a report released in the United Kingdom in 2008 that outlines a series of policy proposals to tackle global warming, financial crisis, and peak oil